St. Rose of Lima Catholic School may refer to:
 St. Rose of Lima Catholic School in Houston, Texas, United States
 St. Rose of Lima School - Toronto Catholic District School Board in Bendale, Scarborough, Toronto, Ontario
 St. Rose of Lima School - Dufferin-Peel Catholic District School Board in Mississauga, Ontario

 St. Rose of Lima Catholic School in Simi Valley California